Euzophera eureka is a species of snout moth in the genus Euzophera. It was described by Roesler in 1970, and is known from Mongolia.

References

Moths described in 1970
Phycitini
Moths of Asia